The Whirlpool Corporation is an American  multinational manufacturer and marketer of home appliances, headquartered in Benton Charter Township, Michigan, United States. The Fortune 500 company has annual revenue of approximately $21 billion, 78,000 employees, and more than 70 manufacturing and technology research centers globally.

The company markets its namesake flagship brand Whirlpool, alongside other brands as well including Maytag, KitchenAid, JennAir, Amana, Gladiator GarageWorks, Inglis, Estate, Brastemp, Bauknecht, Ignis, Indesit, Consul, and, in Europe, Hotpoint (in the Americas, the Hotpoint brand is controlled by Haier).

In its domestic, United States, market Whirlpool has nine manufacturing facilities: Amana, Iowa; Tulsa, Oklahoma; Cleveland, Tennessee; Clyde, Ohio; Findlay, Ohio; Greenville, Ohio; Marion, Ohio; Ottawa, Ohio; and Fall River, Massachusetts.  Together, these American manufacturing facilities account for at least 5% of the company's employees.

History

Founding and first customers
On November 11, 1911, Louis Upton (1886–1952), who worked as an insurance salesman, and his uncle, Emory Upton, who owned a machine shop, founded the Upton Machine Company. Following a failed business venture, Lou acquired a patent to a manual clothes washer. He approached Emory to determine if he could add an electric motor to the design. With the aid of a $5,000 investment from retailing executive Lowell Bassford, they began producing electric motor-driven wringer washers.  Soon after its founding, Lou's younger brother Fred joined the company.

Their first customer, the Federal Electric division of Commonwealth Edison, ordered 100 machines, but a fault in the gear transmission led the customer to threaten their return. After the machines were recalled and repaired, Federal Electric doubled the order. They remained a customer for three years, then they began producing their own washers. The loss of Federal Electric forced Upton to diversify until, in 1916, they landed Sears, Roebuck & Co. as a customer. Sears began selling two types of Upton wringer washers under the "Allen" brand, one for $54.75 and a deluxe model for $95. Sales grew quickly and in 1921, Sears appointed Upton as their sole supplier of washers. To avoid becoming over-reliant on Sears, Upton began marketing a washer under their own brand name.

The increasing volume of sales led Upton to merge with the Nineteen Hundred Washer Company of Binghamton, New York in 1929, adopting the name Nineteen Hundred Corporation. The company was relatively unaffected by the Great Depression. During WWII, its factories were converted to armament production. In 1947, it introduced an automatic, spinner-type washer sold by Sears under the "Kenmore" brand. A year later it was sold by the company under the "Whirlpool" brand name. Lou retired as president in 1949, and was replaced by Elisha "Bud" Gray II.

In response to the post-war consumer demand for convenience products, the company launched a range of home laundry products including wringer and automatic washers, dryers, and irons. In 1949, The Nineteen Hundred Corporation was renamed as the Whirlpool Corporation. In 1951, the philanthropic Whirlpool Foundation was established.

1950s to 1980s: Early acquisitions

To better compete with more diversified manufacturers, in 1955, Whirlpool acquired Seeger Refrigerator Company and RCA's air conditioner and cooking range lines. The company changed its name to Whirlpool-Seeger Corporation and began using the RCA-Whirlpool brand name.  Whirlpool acquired International Harvester Company's refrigeration plant in Evansville, IN in 1955. In 1956, a  administrative center was opened in Benton Harbor, Michigan. In 1957, the RCA Whirlpool Miracle Kitchen was introduced with an estimated 15 million television viewers.  The company changed its name back to Whirlpool Corporation and brought in Robert Elton Brooker as president. At the 1959 American National Exhibition at Sokolniki Park Moscow, Brooker presided over the Whirlpool kitchen. The Whirlpool kitchen inspired the Kitchen Debate between then Vice President Richard Nixon and Soviet Premier Nikita Khrushchev.

In 1966, Whirlpool dropped the RCA name, with the brand then being known as Whirlpool. The following year, the company introduced a 24-hour helpline. Also in 1966, Whirlpool purchased Warwick Electronics, a major television producer for Sears. The purchase also included the division Thomas Organ Company.  Whirlpool exited the television market in 1976 by selling the operations to Japan's Sanyo Electronic Co., but retained the organ business for the electronic technology. By 1978, annual revenues exceeded $2 billion.

In 1986, Whirlpool acquired KitchenAid, a division of the Hobart Corporation. It also announced that it would close most of its manufacturing facilities in the St. Joseph, Michigan area by the end of 1988.

1980s to 2000s: International expansion
In 1987, Whirlpool began selling compact washers in India and acquired a majority interest in Inglis of Canada. In 1988, Whirlpool bought a 53% stake in the large-appliance division of Philips N.V., creating a joint venture called Whirlpool International. The purchase made Whirlpool the world's largest manufacturer of major appliances, with annual sales of approximately $6 billion. The remaining 47% stake was bought from Philips in 1991, completing the acquisition. In 1989, Whirlpool acquired the Roper brand and Bauknecht of Germany.

Whirlpool entered the Indian market in the late 1980s as part of its global expansion strategy. It founded a joint venture with the TVS Group and established the first Whirlpool manufacturing facility in Puducherry, where it manufactured washing machines. In 1995, Whirlpool acquired Kelvinator India Limited, marking an entry into the refrigerator market as well. That same year, the company acquired major shares in TVS joint venture, and in 1996, the Kelvinator and TVS acquisitions were merged to create Whirlpool of India Limited. This expanded the company's portfolio on the Indian subcontinent to include washing machines, refrigerators, microwave ovens, and air conditioners. Whirlpool of India Limited is headquartered in Gurgaon, and it owns three manufacturing facilities at Faridabad, Puducherry and Pune.

In 1997, the company acquired a majority stake in Embraco, a Brazilian maker of compressors for refrigeration. In 2000, it acquired Brazilian appliance maker Multibrás, owner of the brands Brastemp and Consul, including its stake on Embraco. In 2001, Inglis Ltd. changed its name to Whirlpool Canada.  Whirlpool continues to market Inglis appliances to this day.

2000s to present: Growth and closures
By 2004, annual revenues exceeded $13 billion. In 2005, Maytag Corporation shareholders voted to accept Whirlpool Corporation's stock purchase. After the US Justice Department approved the merger in 2006, the company acquired Maytag, including the Maytag, Jenn-Air, Amana, Jade, Magic Chef, Admiral, Hoover, and Dixie-Narco brands. It sold Dixie-Narco to Crane Co., and Amana Commercial to AGA.

In 2007, Whirlpool sold Hoover to Techtronic Industries, TTI Floorcare, and Jade Appliances to Middleby Corporation.  It also closed plants in Newton, Iowa, Searcy, Arkansas, and Herrin, Illinois, resulting in the loss of 4,500 jobs in the affected communities. In 2008, Whirlpool announced the closure of plants in La Vergne, Tennessee, Reynosa, Mexico, Oxford, Mississippi, and Jackson, Tennessee.

In 2009, Whirlpool acquired WC Woods from bankruptcy and closed the company's Evansville, Indiana plant.

In 2011, Whirlpool celebrated its 100th Anniversary and unveiled its 100th Anniversary logo and an updated corporate logo.
It also took over the former KarstadtQuelle brand Privileg from Otto GmbH.

In 2011, Whirlpool announced the closure of the Fort Smith Arkansas plant. The following year Whirlpool opened a manufacturing plant in Cleveland Tennessee replacing a 123-year-old facility. The $200 million project added about 130 jobs to an established workforce of 1,500. The  facility manufactures premium cooking appliances for Whirlpool's portfolio of brands. The project includes a distribution center.

In August 2013, Whirlpool leadership Zachary Guenther - Interim CEO Whirlpool Corporation, 2013 announced it would acquire a 51% majority stake in China's Hefei Royalstar Sanyo (a joint venture between Japan's Sanyo Electric Co, now a unit of Panasonic Corp, and Hefei State-Owned Assets Holding Company Ltd, the investment arm of the local state government) for $552 million and give the company leverage to expand in the Chinese appliance market.

In July 2014, Whirlpool announced it would pay €758 million ($1 billion) to buy a 60% stake in with British brand Hotpoint and Italian rival Indesit (after Hotpoint had already bought out Indesit). In December Whirlpool completed a successful mandatory tender offer for the remaining shares and delisted Indesit from the Milan Stock Exchange. Indesit is now a wholly owned subsidiary of Whirlpool Italia Holdings S.r.l.

In January 2017, Whirlpool announced that it would cut about 500 jobs from its Europe, Middle East and Africa dryer manufacturing unit by 2018. This decision provides the closure of the plant in Amiens, France, which became an issue in the 2017 French presidential election, with both Marine Le Pen and Emmanuel Macron visiting the workers on strike before the second round.

In October 2017, Whirlpool and retailer Sears Holding Corp. reportedly ended their 101-year old association that allowed Whirlpool branded appliances to be sold at Sears stores, and later at Kmart. The companies reportedly were unable to come to an agreement on pricing issues. Whirlpool will continue to supply Kenmore appliances manufactured for Sears.

In March 2020, Whirlpool Corporation announced the official opening of a new Factory Distribution Center in Tulsa, Oklahoma.

In November 2022, Whirlpool acquired the Wisconsin-based company, InSinkErator. The, "world's largest manufacturer of food waste disposers and instant hot water dispensers for home and commercial use".

Social activism

Energy conservation
Whirlpool has received $19.3 million in U.S. Department of Energy funding as part of its Smart Grid Investment Grant program.

Diversity
Whirlpool Corporation has seven employee-run diversity networks that are involved with business, employee, and community projects to address the needs of the groups they represent.  These diversity networks are The Women's Network (WWN), the Veterans' Association (WVA), the Whirlpool African American Network (WAAN), The Pride Network (PRIDE), the Whirlpool Asian Network (WAN), the Whirlpool Hispanic Network (WHN), and the Young Professionals' Network (YP).

LGBT commitment
In 2004, Whirlpool received a 100% rating on the Corporate Equality Index (CEI) released by the lesbian, gay, bisexual, and transgender (LGBT) equal rights organization Human Rights Campaign. At the time, Whirlpool was the first and only major appliance manufacturer to be awarded a perfect score. To date, Whirlpool Corporation has achieved a perfect CEI score for 18 consecutive years, the longest of any major appliance company. Whirlpool was the first appliance maker to feature same-sex families in its advertising in the United States.

Charity work
Whirlpool Corporation is a principal supporter of Habitat for Humanity, a nonprofit organization dedicated to building low-cost, affordable housing. The company's commitment to Habitat for Humanity has exceeded $34 million and it has donated more than 73,000 appliances for Habitat homes.  The company plans to support every Habitat home built globally by 2011, either through product donations, cash, or home sponsorship.

In November 2006, Whirlpool started the annual Building Blocks program, designed to raise awareness and help eliminate substandard housing in the US.  Each year the program recognizes an outstanding US Habitat for Humanity affiliate and its relationship with its local community by holding a week-long build in the affiliate's community. The program kicked off in Nashville, Tennessee, in 2006 when Whirlpool united 100 local residents with 100 Whirlpool employees and volunteers from 100 Habitat affiliates.  These 300 volunteers built 10 homes on one block from Nov. 5–10, 2006.   Whirlpool built nine homes near Phoenix, Arizona, in May 2007, and nine more homes in Dallas, Texas in October 2008. The 2009 build is set to begin August 31 in Atlanta, Georgia.

Carbon footprint
Whirlpool Corporation reported Total CO2e emissions (Direct + Indirect) for the twelve months ending 31 December 2020 at 663 Kt (-21 /-3.1% y-o-y) and is committed to reaching  net zero emissions by 2030.

NASA partnership

In 1962, the company's research laboratories won a contract from NASA to develop the food and waste management system for Project Gemini.  The company later developed freeze-dried ice cream in 1968 under contract to NASA for the Apollo missions. Returning to work with NASA under the Johnson Space Center's Advanced Exploration Systems Logistics Reduction and Repurposing project in 2021, Whirlpool developed a zero-gravity refrigerator in partnership with Purdue University and Air Squared to investigate long term food storage for deep space exploration.

Dryer fire scandal

According to The Guardian newspaper the Whirlpool Corporation was mired in controversy in the UK for its decision not to recall faulty items that have caused deadly fires. Bernard Hender, 19, and Doug McTavish, 39, died following a fire at a flat in Llanrwst, North Wales, on October 10, 2014. Coroner Dave Lewis ruled that the cause of the fire was “on the balance of probabilities” an electrical fault with the door switch on the dryer. He described the evidence presented at the inquest by Whirlpool as “defensive and dismissive” and stated the company's approach was an “obstacle” to finding steps to prevent future fires.

Safety warnings about tumble dryers published on the Indesit and Hotpoint websites in 2015 advised customers that “In some rare cases, excess fluff can come into contact with the heating element and present a risk of fire.” Condensers and vented tumble dryers sold under the brands Hotpoint, Indesit, Creda, Swan and Proline and manufactured over an 11-year period between April 2004 and September 2015 present a fire risk. An estimated 5.3 million tumble dryers were bought in the UK over the time period. Originally, and even after several fires were confirmed as being caused by faulty devices, Whirlpool advised customers that using such devices was safe provided they were not left unattended but would not issue a product recall. Whirlpool offered to fix faulty machines or replace tumble dryers at a cost of £99 - an offer met with derision with consumer groups and in the press. Parliament discussed widespread difficulties with getting faulty machines fixed or replaced, including long wait times and poor service.

On Friday 19 August 2016, a fire broke out on the seventh floor of an 18-storey Shepherds Court building in Shepherd's Bush Green resulting in hundreds of residents being evacuated. London Fire Brigade said 20 fire engines and 120 firefighters were sent to tackle the blaze at 3.44pm, and that it was under control by 5.30pm. The occupants were at home when smoke started pouring out of the tumble dryer and they alerted fire crews, with the fire later confirmed as being caused by a faulty Indesit branded Whirlpool tumble dryer.

At the time Whirlpool advised customers that ”You may continue to use your tumble dryer whilst waiting for the modification, however, we require that you do not leave your dryer unattended during operation as an extra precaution (i.e. do not leave the house or leave the dryer on whilst asleep)” but would not issue a product recall.

On 26 August 2016, London Fire Brigade advised the public to stop all use of faulty tumble dryers immediately and through its Total Recall campaign, called on Whirlpool to change its advice to customers and promote a product recall, advice also issued by Which? and the "Expect It's Safe" campaign set up by lawyers representing victims of fires started by faulty appliances. The London Fire Brigade commented that they get called out to a fire started by faulty domestic appliances nearly once every day and issued a five-point notice concerning Whirlpool's advice on faulty appliances:
 The safety notice was issued due to the danger of fire and any fire has the potential to endanger life and property.
 It's impractical for most people to remain with an appliance for the duration of a drying cycle.
 If the dryer does catch fire while it's attended this still presents a risk to the occupants.
 If the owner attempts to put out a fire in an appliance they could be putting their life at risk. The Brigade's advice is to not risk tackling the fire, always raise the alarm, get out, stay out and call 999.
 The time a fire may break out because of a fault is unpredictable. The ignition of fluff accumulated around a heating element may cause a smouldering fire which might not be discovered until the appliance has finished being used and the owner has gone to bed.

In September 2016, Andy Slaughter, the MP for Hammersmith whose constituency includes Shepherd's Bush said the government had failed to stand up to the “powerful industry lobby” representing white goods manufacturers. He was reported to have urged ministers to instruct Whirlpool and other companies to change their advice to customers, and insisted that faulty appliances that may cause fires be recalled and replaced. In a session of parliament on 13 September 2016, Slaughter revealed that he had "tracked down 750 fires caused by Whirlpool dryers and by dryers from brands owned by Whirlpool between 2004 and 2015. We know about 127 models, but Whirlpool will not publish the full list."

The same month, following the publication of the investigation results into the Shepherd's Bush blaze that concluded the faulty tumble dryer was to blame for starting the fire and other fires across the UK, pressure grew on Whirlpool and the government to do more to reassure the public. Dave Brown, London fire brigade's director of operations, said, “This fire has highlighted just how dangerous faulty white goods can be... disappointingly though, Whirlpool have still not changed their advice to consumers. We are now appealing once again for them to change their advice and bring it into line with our own. Thankfully there were no serious injuries in the Shepherd’s Bush fire but we may not be so lucky if it happens again.”

In October 2016, Margot James, the British government's Customer Minister, said: “Customer safety must be the number one priority for manufacturers. I acknowledge that Whirlpool are making great efforts to modify and replace at-risk machines, but I believe additional action is required to reassure customers and the public. I will be writing to the company to set out my concerns and expectations.”

In December 2016, the UK's largest customer advocacy group, Which?, who had previously produced a list of the 113 models of tumble dryer at risk, took the unusual step to seeking a judicial review of Peterborough Trading Standards - the agency named as responsible for handling of the faulty tumble dryers sold by Whirlpool - labelling the handling as a “fiasco” and claiming that it has failed millions of consumers across the UK by not enforcing product safety laws. Peterborough city council had been dealing with Whirlpool because its UK head office is located in the city. The move was considered unusual as it was the first time Which? had made a formal legal move involving trading standards "in order to assess the lawfulness of its decision to allow householders to continue to use faulty machines, despite the risk of them bursting into flames".

Leon Livermore, Chief Executive of the Chartered Trading Standards Institute was critical of Whirlpool not recalling faulty tumble dryers, urging "Whirlpool to recall the millions of potentially faulty tumble dryers in people's homes", but came to the defence of Peterborough Trading Standards, saying, "The whole system has been overwhelmed by the size of this, and it’s a bit unfair on a local authority such as Peterborough to have to take responsibility for what is a national issue.”

In response to the criticism, a Peterborough city council spokesman said: “An independent review, which began earlier this month, is currently taking place and we would expect the company to fully comply with the outcome. We will strongly defend our position if Which? is granted a judicial review and bearing in mind the ongoing independent review we consider that this action is premature.”

On 22 February 2017, Whirlpool received two enforcement notices from Peterborough Trading Standards following the trading standards internal review. 15 months after Whirlpool advised customers that it was safe to continue using faulty tumble dryers providing they were not left unattended, it was required to update its advice to customers advising them to unplug the appliances and stop using them until they were repaired. Whirlpool was also required to publicise the changed advice to consumers through advertisements in national newspapers, through social media and in stores. The enforcement notices had been originally issued on 16 January 2017, and were rejected by Whirlpool, which filed for an appeal that was then rejected. Had the company not complied with the notices at this point, it would have been taken to court. According to The Guardian, the latest action followed “an escalation” in the number of incidents caused by affected machines.

On Wednesday 25 April 2018, BBC One television consumer show Watchdog broadcast further allegations regarding Whirlpool's safety recall of tumble dryers. The show explained how tumble dryers that had already been modified and supposedly made safe were still catching fire. Furthermore, newer models which were deemed “safe” by Whirlpool were actually being manufactured with the same flaws of previous unsafe models. BBC Watchdog attempted to speak to a spokesman from Whirlpool but the company did not provide anyone to answer these allegations on the show.

On 17 December 2019, Whirlpool issued a recall of over 500,000 Hotpoint- and Indesit-branded washing machines due to risk of fire. The machines were demonstrated to be prone to overheating and catching fire due to a fault with their heating apparatus.

Major brands

Specialty labels
 Admiral-branded appliances are sold exclusively at Home Depot, the brand was also formerly sold at Montgomery Ward stores until the company's demise in 2001. 
 Crosley branded top-load washing machines are made for Crosley Appliances
 Falabella branded appliances are made for Falabella (South America Only)
 FSP (Factory Specification Parts)
 IKEA branded appliances were made for IKEA (North America Only)
 Kenmore branded appliances were made for Sears.  Although other designations were used, 110. is the common first 3 digits, of a model number, of a Kenmore product built by Whirlpool.

References

External links

 
 

 
American companies established in 1911
Electronics companies established in 1911
Manufacturing companies based in Michigan
1911 establishments in Michigan
Berrien County, Michigan
Companies listed on the New York Stock Exchange
Home appliance brands
Home appliance manufacturers of the United States
Heating, ventilation, and air conditioning companies
Goods manufactured in Mexico